Peter von Gomm (born August 23, 1968) is an American voice actor. He moved to Japan in 1999 and records television commercials, documentaries, video games and more for the Japanese and global market.

Career
Gomm was born on August 23, 1968 in Portland, Oregon, USA. Gomm worked for the Smithsonian Institution in Washington D.C. for 4 years as an exhibition designer and primarily did editorial designs for handicapped and audiobook narration. In 1995, he moved to Japan to work as a voice actor and narrator in Tokyo.

He has regularly done narrator work of Basic English 2, Practical Business English and Radio English Conversation Study of NHK Radio Courses. He was an NHK World's news reporter. He did several character voices of the NHK Educational Programme, Little Charo 2. He has voiced in the Speed Learning audiobook for English for over 10 years. In CS Benesse Channel, Eigo de GO!, Gomm played a main role "teacher" as an actor and a voice actor. In 2003, Gomm was cast as the main role character "RD" of US animation series Zoids: Fuzors of Cartoon Network. He did video game character voices for games on PlayStation 3 and the Nintendo DS. He also did narration works of TV documentary programmes and company promotional videos.

On October 14, 2017, Gomm started a YouTube channel called Peter von Gomm Japan. It has videos about the motorcycle culture and interesting places in Japan. As of June 2022 the channel has 23 thousand subscribers.

Personal life
Gomm is married to a Japanese woman called Kyoko. His son Jyoji was born in 2010.

Filmography

Television

Tokusatsu

Video games

References

External links
 
 

1968 births
20th-century American male actors
21st-century American male actors
American expatriates in Japan
American male video game actors
American male voice actors
Living people
Male actors from Portland, Oregon